A boy band is a vocal group consisting of young male singers.

Boy band, Boyband, or BoyBand may also refer to:

Boyband (band), New Zealand musical group
BoybandPH, a Philippines band
Boyband, Israeli band
BoyBand (film), 2010 film
Boy Band (TV series), a reality singing competition

See also
Boy (disambiguation)